Denisha Ghumra (born 13 November 1995) is an Indian actress from Gujarat, India. She is known for her role in Gujarati films Hellaro (2019), Saatam Aatham (2022) and Raktbeej (2022).

Biography
Denisha was born on 13 November 1995 in Jamnagar, Gujarat. She received her school education in Jamnagar, and college education from KS School of Business Management and Upasna School of Performing Arts.

She debuted in 2019 Gujarati period drama film Hellaro, which won the National Film Award for Best Feature Film at the 66th National Film Awards and she earned Special Jury Award for her performance. The film has been theatrically released in India on 8 November 2019 to positive reviews and her acting is appreciated by the audiences. She later acted in Hardik Parikh's Raktbeej, and in Shital Shah's Saatam Aatham. Her film Bharat Maro Desh Che directed by Bhavin Trivedi has been selected in International Gujarati Film Festival.

Awards and accolades

Filmography

References

External links
 

Special Jury Award (feature film) National Film Award winners
1995 births
Living people
Gujarati people
Actresses in Gujarati cinema
People from Jamnagar